Thomas Buchanan Read (March 12, 1822 – May 11, 1872), was an American poet and portrait painter.

Biography

Read was born in Corner Ketch, a hamlet close to Downingtown, in Chester County, Pennsylvania on March 12, 1822.

Beside painting, Read wrote a prose romance, The Pilgrims of the Great St. Bernard, and several books of poetry, including The New Pastoral, The House by the Sea, Sylvia, and A Summer Story. Some of the shorter pieces included in these, e.g., Sheridan's Ride, Drifting, The Angler, The Oath, and The Closing Scene, have great merit.  Read was briefly associated with the Pre-Raphaelite Brotherhood. His greatest artistic popularity took place in Florence. Among portraits he painted were Abraham Lincoln, Henry Wadsworth Longfellow, Alfred Tennyson,  Elizabeth Barrett Browning, Robert Browning and William Henry Harrison. Read died from injuries sustained in a carriage accident, which weakened him and led him to contract pneumonia while on shipboard returning to America.  He was interred at Laurel Hill Cemetery in Philadelphia.

Literary works 

 Poems. 1847
 The Female Poets of America With Portraits, Biographical Notices, and Specimens of Their Writings. 1849
 Lays and Ballads 1849
 Thoraren the Skald. 1850
 The Stolen Child. 1850
 Edward A. Brackett's Marble Group of the Shipwrecked Mother and Child. 1852
 The Pilgrims of the Great St. Bernard. 1853
 The New Pastoral. 1855
 The House by the Sea. A Poem. 1855
 Sylvia, or, The Last Shepherd An Eclogue, and Other Poems. 1857
 Rural Poems. 1857
 James L. Claghorn, Esq. 1860
 Sheridan's Ride. 1864
 The Descent of the Eagle. 1865
 The Soldier's Friend. 1865
 The Eagle and the Vulture. 1866
 The Poetical Works of Thomas Buchanan Read: Complete in Three Volumes. 1867

References

 "Read, Thomas Buchanan." American Authors 1600–1900. H. W. Wilson Company, NY 1938.
 
 worldcat, accessdate= September 7, 2008

External links

 
 
 

1822 births
1872 deaths
19th-century American poets
American male poets
19th-century American painters
19th-century American male artists
American male painters
American portrait painters
People from Chester County, Pennsylvania
Poets from Pennsylvania
Painters from Pennsylvania
American expatriates in Italy
Deaths from pneumonia in New York (state)
Burials at Laurel Hill Cemetery (Philadelphia)
19th-century American male writers